Etosha National Park is a national park in northwestern Namibia and one of the largest national parks in Africa. It was proclaimed a game reserve in March 1907 in Ordinance 88 by the Governor of German South West Africa, Friedrich von Lindequist. It was designated as Wildschutzgebiet in 1958, and was elevated to the status of a national park in 1967 by an act of parliament of the Republic of South Africa. The area is home to hundreds of species of mammals, birds and reptiles, including several threatened and endangered species such as the black rhinoceros. Sixty-one black rhinoceros were killed during poaching in Namibia during 2022, 46 of whom were killed in Etosha.

The park is located in the Kunene region and shares boundaries with the regions of Oshana, Oshikoto and Otjozondjupa.

History 

Areas north of the Etosha pan were inhabited by Ovambo people, while various Otjiherero-speaking groups lived immediately outside the current park boundaries. The areas inside the park close to the Etosha pan had Khoisan-speaking Hai//om people.

Explorers Charles John Andersson and Francis Galton are the first Europeans to record the existence of the Etosha pan on 29 May 1851, although it was already widely known by locals. These European explorers were traveling with Ovambo copper ore traders when they arrived at Omutjamatunda (now known as Namutoni). They passed through, and came to know of, the Etosha pan when they traveled north upon leaving Namutoni. The name Etosha (spelled Etotha in early literature) comes from Oshindonga word meaning "Great White Place" referring to the Etosha pan. The Hai//om called the pan Khubus which means "totally bare, white place with lots of dust".  The pan is also known as Chums, which refers to the noise made by a person's feet when walking on the clay of the pan. 

At this time the Hai//om people recognized the Ovambo chief at Ondonga but the Hereros did not. The Hai||om were forcibly removed from the park in the 1954, ending their hunter-gatherer lifestyle to become landless farm laborers. The Hai||om have had a recognized Traditional Authority since 2004 which helps facilitate communications between the community and the government. The government of Namibia acknowledges the park to be the home of Hai||om people and has plans to resettle displaced families on farms adjacent to the national park. Since 2007 the Government has acquired six farms directly south of the Gobaub depression in Etosha National Park. A number of families have settled on these farms under the leadership of Chief David Khamuxab, Paramount Chief of the Hai||om.

European settlers 
In 1885, entrepreneur William Worthington Jordan bought a huge tract of land from Ovambo chief Kambonde. The price for the land was £300 sterling, paid for by 25 firearms, one salted horse and a cask of brandy. Dorstland Trekkers first travelled through the park between 1876 and 1879 on their way to Angola. The trekkers returned in 1885 and settled on  farms given to them at no charge by Jordan. The trekkers named the area Upingtonia after the Prime Minister of the Cape Colony. The settlement had to be abandoned in 1886 after clashes with the Hai||om and defeat by Chief Nehale Mpingana.

German South-West Africa 

The German Reich ordered troops to occupy the Okaukuejo, Namutoni and Sesfontein in 1886 in order to kill migrating wildlife to stop spread of rinderpest to cattle. A fort was built by the German cavalry in 1889 at the site of the Namutoni spring. On 28 January 1904, 500 men under Nehale Mpingana attacked Imperial Germany Schutztruppe at Fort Namutoni and completely destroyed it, driving out the colonial forces and taking over their horses and cattle. The fort was rebuilt and troops stationed once again when the area was declared a game reserve in 1907; Lieutenant Adolf Fischer of Fort Namutoni then became its first "game warden".

Boundary 

The present-day Etosha National Park has had many major and minor boundary changes since its inception in 1907. The major boundary changes since 1907 were because of Ordinance 18 of 1958 and Ordinance 21 of 1970.

When the Etosha area was proclaimed as "Game Reserve 2" by Ordinance 88 of 1907, the park stretched from the mouths of the Cunene River and Hoarusib River on the Skeleton Coast to Namutoni in the east. The Odendaal Commission's (1963) decision resulted in the demarcation of the present-day park boundary in 1970.

Etosha Ecological Institute 

The Etosha Ecological Institute was formally opened on 1 April 1974 by Adolf Brinkmann of the South-West African Administration. The institute is responsible for all management-related research in the park. Classification of vegetation, population and ecological studies on wildebeest, elephants and lions, and studies on anthrax were among the first major topics to be investigated. The EEI has collaborations with researchers from universities in Namibia, the United States, the United Kingdom, Germany, South Africa, Australia, Norway and Israel.

Geography

Etosha Pan 

The salt pans are the most noticeable geological features in the national park. The hypersaline conditions of the pan limit the species that can permanently inhabit the pan itself; occurrences of extremophile micro-organisms are present, which species can tolerate the hypersaline conditions. The salt pan is usually dry, but fills with water briefly in the summer, when it attracts pelicans and flamingos in particular. In the dry season, winds blowing across the salt pan pick up saline dust and carry it across the country and out over the southern Atlantic. This salt enrichment provides minerals to the soil downwind of the pan on which some wildlife depends, though the salinity also creates challenges to farming. The Etosha Pan was one of several sites throughout southern Africa in the Southern African Regional Science Initiative (SAFARI 2000). Using satellites, aircraft, and ground-based data from sites such as Etosha, partners in this program collected a wide variety of data on aerosols, land cover, and other characteristics of the land and atmosphere to study and understand the interactions between people and the natural environment.

Dolomite Hills 
The dolomite hills on the southern border of the park near the Andersson entrance gate are called Ondundozonananandana, meaning the place where young boy herding cattle went to never return, probably implying a high density of predators like leopards in the hills, giving the mountains its English name of Leopard Hills. The Halali area is also home to dolomite hills within the park, with one hill inside the camp and the nearby Twee Koppies. Western Etosha is also dominated by dolomite hills which is the only place in the park that has mountain zebra.

Climate 
The Etosha National Park has a savanna desert climate. As it is a desert, there is a large variation between day and night. Rain almost never falls in the winter.

Vegetation types 

In most places in the park, the pans are devoid of vegetation with the exception of halophytic Sporobolus salsus, a protein-rich grass that is eaten by grazers like blue wildebeest and springbok. The areas around the Etosha pan also have other halophytic vegetation including grasses like Sporobolus spicatus and Odyssea paucinervis, as well as shrubs like Suaeda articulata. Most of the park is savanna woodlands except for areas close to the pan. Mopane is the most common tree, estimated to be around 80% of all trees in the park. The sandveld of north-eastern corner of Etosha is dominated by acacia and Terminalia trees. Tamboti trees characterize the woodlands south of the sandveld. Dwarf shrub savanna occurs areas close to the pan and is home to several small shrubs including a halophytic succulent Salsola etoshensis. Thorn bush savanna occurs close to the pan on limestone and alkaline soils and is dominated by acacia species such as Acacia nebrownii, Acacia luederitzii, Acacia melliferra, Acacia hebeclada and Acacia tortilis. Grasslands in the park are mainly around the Etosha pan where the soil is sandy. Depending on the soil and the effects of the pan, grasslands could be dominated by one of the Eragrostis, Sporobolus, Monelytrum, Odyssea or Enneapogon species.

Fauna 

The park has about 114 mammal species, 340 bird species, 110 reptile species, 16 amphibian species and 1 species of fish (up to 49 species of fish during floods).

History 
By 1881, large game mammals like elephants, rhinoceroses and lions had been nearly exterminated in the region. The proclamation of the game reserve helped some of the animals recover, but some species like buffalo and wild dogs have been extinct since the middle of the 20th century. A writer from Otjiwarongo was appointed game warden in 1951, and he considered the grasslands to be severely overgrazed. A bone meal plant was constructed near Rietfontein, and culling of zebras and wildebeests began in 1952. Official records indicate 293 zebras and 122 wildebeest were processed at the plant, but conservationists claimed thousands had been culled and successfully forced the plant's closure during the same year. The drought that began in the year 1980 resulted in the largest capture and culling operation in the history of the park. 2235 mountain zebras and 450 plains zebras were captured, culled or sold. 525 elephants were culled and processed at a temporary abattoir near Olifantsrus.

Since 2005, the protected area is considered part of a Lion Conservation Unit.

Mammals 
Commonly seen mammals in the park, past and present, are listed in the table below:

Birds 
This overview is only one indication of the diversity of birds in the park and is not a complete list.

See also 
 Okonjima

References

Further reading

External links 

Etosha on PBS
Etosha Travel Guide
Etosha Travel Information

 
National parks of Namibia
1907 establishments in German South West Africa
1958 establishments in South West Africa
1958 establishments in South Africa
1967 establishments in South West Africa
1967 establishments in South Africa
Protected areas established in 1907
Protected areas established in 1958
Protected areas established in 1967